Jonathan Currie Byrd (born January 27, 1978) is an American professional golfer. He was the 2002 PGA Tour Rookie of the Year, and has won five times on the PGA Tour.

Biography
Byrd was born in Anderson, South Carolina. He attended Clemson University from 1997 to 2000. During his Clemson career, Byrd was the first four-time First Team All-ACC player in Clemson history and was named a First Team All-America in 1999. He represented the United States on the Walker Cup team in 1999. 
 
Byrd turned professional in 2000 and played on the Buy.Com Tour (now Web.com Tour), winning the Buy.com Charity Pro-Am at The Cliffs and finishing eighth on the money list.

In his first season on the PGA Tour in 2002, Byrd won the Buick Challenge and was named PGA Tour Rookie of the Year. Byrd won the B.C. Open in 2004 and the John Deere Classic in 2007.

Byrd had an average season in 2008 with two top-10s and a little over $1,000,000 in earnings. His best finish in 2009 was at the Memorial Tournament, where he was joint second round leader with Jim Furyk. Byrd would go on to finish T3.

On July 7, 2009, Byrd 's father, James, died aged 65 after a long struggle with brain cancer. The death of his father caused Byrd to withdraw from the John Deere Classic, an event he won in 2007.

On October 24, 2010, Byrd defeated Martin Laird and Cameron Percy in a sudden-death playoff at the Justin Timberlake Shriners Hospitals for Children Open for his fourth PGA Tour title. Byrd made a hole-in-one on the fourth hole of the playoff, the par-3 17th, to win the championship. On January 9, 2011, Byrd defeated Robert Garrigus on the second hole of a playoff to win the PGA Tour season opener the Hyundai Tournament of Champions.

On October 2, 2017, Byrd won the 2017 Web.com Tour Championship by four strokes, securing his full PGA Tour card for the first time since 2014.

Amateur wins
this list may be incomplete
1999 Northeast Amateur

Professional wins (7)

PGA Tour wins (5)

PGA Tour playoff record (2–1)

Web.com Tour wins (2)

Results in major championships

CUT = missed the half way cut
"T" indicates a tie for a place.

Summary

Most consecutive cuts made – 2 (three times)
Longest streak of top-10s – 1

Results in The Players Championship

CUT = missed the halfway cut
"T" indicates a tie for a place

Results in World Golf Championships

QF, R16, R32, R64 = Round in which player lost in match play
"T" = Tied
Note that the HSBC Champions did not become a WGC event until 2009.

PGA Tour career summary

* As of the 2020 season.
** Byrd did not join the PGA Tour until 2002 so he was not ranked on the money list until then.

U.S. national team appearances
Amateur
Palmer Cup: 1999 (winners), 2000
Walker Cup: 1999
Professional
Wendy's 3-Tour Challenge (representing PGA Tour): 2011

See also
2001 Buy.com Tour graduates
2017 Web.com Tour Finals graduates

References

External links

Player Bio: Clemson Official Athletic site

American male golfers
Clemson Tigers men's golfers
PGA Tour golfers
Korn Ferry Tour graduates
Golfers from South Carolina
People from Anderson, South Carolina
1978 births
Living people